Luciano Russo is an Italian prelate of the Catholic Church who works in the diplomatic service of the Holy See.

Biography 
Russo was born in Lusciano, Italy, on 23 June 1963. He was ordained priest of the Diocese of Aversa on 1 October 1988.

He entered the diplomatic service of the Holy See on 1 July 1993 and filled assignments in Papua Nuova Guinea, Syria, Brazil, the Netherlands, the United States, Honduras and Bulgaria.

On 27 January 2012 Pope Benedict XVI appointed him Titular Archbishop of Monteverde and on 16 February named him Apostolic Nuncio to Rwanda. He received his episcopal consecration in Caserta on 14 April 2012 from Cardinal Tarcisio Bertone.

Pope Francis named him Apostolic Nuncio to Algeria and Tunisia on 14 June 2016. Pope Francis named him Apostolic Nuncio to Panama on 22 August 2020.

Pope Francis named him Apostolic Nuncio to Uruguay on 18 December 2021.

Pope Francis named him Secretary for Pontifical Representations of Secretariat of State on 10 September 2022.

See also
 List of heads of the diplomatic missions of the Holy See

References

External links
Catholic Hierarchy: Archbishop Luciano Russo 

1963 births
21st-century Italian Roman Catholic titular archbishops
Living people
People from the Province of Caserta
Apostolic Nuncios to Rwanda
Apostolic Nuncios to Algeria
Apostolic Nuncios to Tunisia
Apostolic Nuncios to Panama
Apostolic Nuncios to Uruguay